Tia Texada (born December 14, 1971) is an American actress and model. She is best known for her role as Sgt. Maritza Cruz on the NBC series Third Watch, and her recurring role as an undercover agent Ribera on The Unit for CBS. Other roles include, In Plain Sight, Saving Grace, Chuck for NBC, HBO's Mind of the Married Man, Everybody Hates Chris, The Amazing Spider-Man, Batman Beyond, Static Shock, Firebreather, and Handy Manny. She was the voice of Maybelline New York for 15 years, the number-one selling cosmetic brand in the world, appearing prominently in the brand’s "Maybe Shes Born With it... Maybe It's Maybelline" campaign, which was named Brand of the Year and Launch of the Year for Lash Sensational. She was the first female live announcer for the ESPY Awards, where she worked alongside Justin Timberlake, Jamie Foxx, LeBron James, and Samuel L. Jackson for seven years. She was the voice of the winning Golden Trailer award for RoboCop. She was the voice for launching Super Bowl 50 for The NFL Today on CBS, Flesh and Bone for Starz, Lindt Gold Bunny, Zales, Unstoppable Collection, JC Penney World Cup Soccer IS for Girls, World Series of Poker Lady Luck for ESPN, and the Skittles 'Taste the Rainbow' ad campaign.

Early life
Texada was born and raised in Lake Charles, Louisiana. Her mother was a reflexologist, and her father was an insurance agent.

Texada was born with severe strabismus. She underwent corrective eye surgery and had to wear an eye patch. As a result of the resulting bullying she was subjected to, she was shy as a child, and took an acting class to overcome social anxiety. Afterwards, she decided to pursue an acting career.

Career
Texada's appearances include guest-starring roles in episodes of In Plain Sight, Chuck ("Chuck Versus the Coup d'Etat"), Saving Grace, Everybody Hates Chris, The Unit, and Criminal Minds. She played Sgt. Maritza Cruz in the NBC Drama Third Watch in the last three of its six seasons.

She also has appeared in movies such as From Dusk Till Dawn (1996), Paulie (1998), Nurse Betty (2000), Bait (2000), Thirteen Conversations About One Thing (2001), Glitter (2001), Phone Booth (2003), and Spartan (2004).

Texada also has a singing career, and her songs have been featured on shows such as Dawson's Creek. She also played at the Lilith Fair tour in 1998.

She played the voice of Isabel Vasquez in the TV movie Firebreather. Texada has lent her voice to the animated series The Wild Thornberrys, and Static Shock, as well as television commercials. She is currently the voice of Elena Validus on the animated show Ben 10: Ultimate Alien as Alyssa Diaz's voice double.

Texada has also done layouts for magazines and has been featured in the men's magazines FHM and Maxim.

She appeared in The Amazing Spider-Man, where she is accidentally stripped out of her top by Peter Parker.

She also appeared as guest-star in the Freeform television series Stitchers.

Filmography

Film

Television

Video games

References

External links

American film actresses
American television actresses
American video game actresses
American voice actresses
Living people
20th-century American actresses
21st-century American actresses
21st-century American singers
21st-century American women singers
1971 births